Opinorelia is a monotypic genus of palmleaf snails that is endemic to Australia's Lord Howe Island in the Tasman Sea. 

The species is Opinorelia howeinsulae, also known as the scaly palmleaf snail.

Description
The globosely turbinate to conical shell of adult snails is 4–5.5 mm in height, with a diameter of 2–3.5 mm. It is yellowish-brown in colour, with a pointed spire. The animal's body is pale brown with dark grey cephalic tentacles.

Habitat
The snail occurs across the island, in rainforest and moist woodland, and is usually found in leaf litter, especially fallen palm leaves.

References

 
Assimineidae
Taxa named by Tom Iredale
Monotypic gastropod genera
Gastropods of Lord Howe Island
Gastropods described in 1944